These products, even though Netflix lists them as Netflix Originals, are programs that have been aired in different countries, and Netflix has bought exclusive distribution rights to stream them in other various countries. They may be available on Netflix in their home territory and other markets where Netflix does not have the first run license, without the Netflix Original label, some time after their first-run airing on their original broadcaster.

Feature films

Documentaries

Specials

Upcoming

Feature films

Specials

Notes

References

External links

 
Netflix